Galician Progressive Coalition (Galician: Coalición Progresista Galega, CPG) was a centre-right Galician political coalition formed for the municipal elections of 1987.

Member parties
 Galician Coalition 
 People's Democratic Party
 Liberal Party

History

Coalition
CPG was born after the rupture of People's Coalition in Galicia. The smaller parties of the former coalition joined the Galician nationalist party Galician Coalition, that had just suffered the split of the Galician Nationalist Party. CPG was the third most voted party in the elections, with very good results in the Province of A Coruña. In total, the coalition won 54 mayors and 610 local seats.

Election results

Local councils

References

 Beramendi, X.G. and Núñez Seixas, X.M. (1996): O nacionalismo galego. A Nosa Terra, Vigo
 Beramendi, X.G. (2007): De provincia a nación. Historia do galeguismo político. Xerais, Vigo

Political parties in Galicia (Spain)